Wilbert "Wibs" Kautz (September 7, 1915 – May 1979) was an American professional basketball player. He spent three seasons in the National Basketball League (NBL) and one season in the Basketball Association of America (BAA). His career in the NBL began during the 1939–40 season through the 1941–42 season all spent as a member of the Chicago Bruins. His one season in the BAA was spent on the Chicago Stags 1946–47 roster. He attended Loyola University Chicago.

BAA career statistics

Regular season

Playoffs

External links

1915 births
1979 deaths
All-American college men's basketball players
American men's basketball players
Basketball players from Chicago
Chicago Bruins players
Chicago Stags players
Forwards (basketball)
Guards (basketball)
Loyola Ramblers men's basketball players